The 2012 autumn internationals, also known as the autumn tests, November tests and, in the Southern Hemisphere, the end of year tests, were international rugby union matches. They were predominantly played between visiting Southern Hemisphere countries and European nations.

The IRB introduced an International Rugby Series, to improve competitiveness ahead of the next World Cup, that included Tier 2 nations Tonga, Canada, Russia, Samoa and the United States. The first tournament was held at Colwyn Bay's Eirias Stadium in North Wales.

The tournament was in addition to those tests played between Tier 1 and Tier 2 nations. Wales and France hosted Samoa, England and Ireland hosted Fiji and Scotland and Italy hosted Tonga.

Both Georgia and Romania hosted Japan, while Portugal travelled to South America to play a two test tour, where they earn victories over Uruguay and Chile. Namibia hosted a tournament including Spain and Zimbabwe, with Spain winning both tests to clinch the tournament.

Matches

October

Notes:
 James Hanson made his international debut for Australia in this match.
 Keven Mealamu won his 100th cap for the All Blacks, he became the 22nd international player and 3rd All Black to reach the landmark.
 Piri Weepu equalled the record held by Ollie le Roux for most international caps from the bench with his 43rd substitute appearance from his 66 caps.
 Tony Woodcock equalled the All Black record held by Kees Meeuws for most yellow cards in a career with his third yellow card.
 The draw ended New Zealand's 16-match winning streak, also ending their chances of surpassing Lithuania's record streak of 18 wins.
 This match ended New Zealand's sequence of 105 consecutive matches of scoring a try in a match, it was the first match the All Blacks didn't score a try since 2004. The run of 105 consecutive matches of scoring a try in a match remains an international rugby record.

4 November

10/11 November

Notes:
 Argentina's victory came exactly 11 years after their last win over Wales at the Millennium Stadium.

Notes:
 Michael Bent, Iain Henderson, Dave Kilcoyne and Richardt Strauss (all Ireland) made their full international debuts.
 The starting hookers, Adriaan (South Africa) and Richardt Strauss (Ireland), are cousins, the latter qualifying on residency grounds.
 Ronan O'Gara (Ireland) earned his 127th international cap (125 with Ireland and 2 with the British and Irish Lions) and overtook Brian O'Driscoll as the sole second most-capped player in rugby union history behind Australia's George Gregan (139).

Notes:
 Yannick Forestier, Jocelino Suta, Sébastien Vahaamahina (all France) and Paddy Ryan (Australia) made their international debuts.
 This match ended Australia's seven-year winning streak against France, France's previous victory against Australia dating back to 5 November 2005 (26–16).
 The French came within one point of their largest ever victory against Australia (34–6 in 1976).

Notes:
 Henry Pyrgos (Scotland), Dane Coles and Tawera Kerr-Barlow (both New Zealand) made their international debuts.
 Scotland became the first team to score three tries against New Zealand since New Zealand's loss to Australia in August 2011.

13 November

Notes:
 The Tigers returned to using their traditional lettered-flocked jerseys for this non-test match. They last used this system when they hosted Australia in 2010.

16/17 November

Notes:
 This was a non-capped match for Ireland, but was a fully capped match for Fiji. The IRB gave this match a no-test status, which means rankings would not change regardless of the outcome but will be part of the new scheme to increase competitiveness in Tier 2 teams ahead of the next World Cup.

21 November

23/24/25 November

Notes:
 This result was Tonga's first ever win over Scotland.
 This defeat was Scotland's first at Aberdeen's Pittodrie Stadium.

1 December

Notes:
 Freddie Burns (England) made his international debut.
 England claimed the Hillary Shield for the first time.
 This was England's biggest win over New Zealand, the most points they have ever scored against them, and their first win against them in 10 years.
 This was also New Zealand's joint second-largest defeat; at the time only Australia had beaten them by more.
 This was New Zealand's first defeat since they became world champions, and their first in 22 matches.

Notes:
 Australia captain Nathan Sharpe kicked for the conversion to end his career in the Australian squad.
 No replacement was made when Halfpenny was taken off due to injury.

2012 International Rugby Series
For more details on this topic, see: 2012 International Rugby Series

Effect on 2015 Rugby World Cup seeding
Much like the 2008 end of year series, the final IRB rankings at the end of the international window will play a massive part towards the seeding of the 2015 Rugby World Cup. Like the 2011 tournament, the IRB rankings will play a pivotal role in proceedings with the top four placed sides at the end of the international window set to be kept apart in the draw. All 12 of the automatic qualifiers will be seeded based on their ranking and then split three bands of four teams.

 Band 1 will be made up of the top 4 automatic qualifiers
 Band 2 will be made up of the next 4 automatic qualifiers (5–8)
 Band 3 will be made up of the next 4 automatic qualifiers (9–12)
 Band 4 will be made up of the remaining due to qualify places (Oceania 1, Europe 1, Asia 1 and Americas 1)
 Band 5 will include the remaining possible nations (Africa 1,Europe 2, Americas 2 and repechage Winner)

Following the final matches on 1 December 2012, the 12 teams automatically qualified were seeded thus:

Pot 1

Pot 2

Pot 3

Pot 4
Americas 1
Asia 1
Europe 1
Oceania 1

Pot 5
Africa 1
Americas 2
Europe 2
Repechage Winner

See also
 End of year rugby union tests
 2012 mid-year rugby union tests
 2012 Emirates Cup of Nations
 2012 International Rugby Series
 2012 Māori All Blacks tour of United Kingdom
 2012 Namibian Tri-Nations
 2015 Rugby World Cup

References

External links
 2012 end-of-year rugby union tests at ESPN
 
 Welsh Rugby Union
 Rugby Football Union
 Planet Rugby

2012
2012–13 in European rugby union
2012 in Oceanian rugby union
2012 in North American rugby union
2012 in South American rugby union
2012 in South African rugby union
2012–13 in Japanese rugby union